Boerewors, is a type of sausage which originated in South Africa. It is an important part of South African, Zimbabwean, Botswana and Namibian cuisine and is popular across Southern Africa. According to South African government regulation, boerewors must contain at least 90 percent meat or fat from beef, pork, lamb or goat. The other 10% is made up of spices and other ingredients. Not more than 30% of the meat content may be fat. Boerewors may not contain offal or any "mechanically recovered" meat pulp (as recovered through a process where meat and bone are mechanically separated).

History
Boerewors is made from coarsely minced beef (sometimes combined with minced pork, lamb, or both) and spices (usually toasted coriander seed, black pepper, nutmeg, cloves and allspice). Like many other forms of sausage, boerewors contains a high proportion of fat, and is preserved with salt and vinegar, and packed in sausage casings. Traditional boerewors is usually formed into a continuous spiral. It is often served with pap (traditional South African porridge / polenta made from mielie-meal). Boerewors is also very common throughout Namibia, Botswana, Mozambique and Zimbabwe as well as with expatriate South African communities worldwide.

Guinness World Record
On 3 May 2014, the Guinness World Record for braaing the longest boerewors in the world was broken in South Africa. It measured  in length. The boerewors was distributed freely to old-age homes and the Abraham Kriel Orphanage.

Preparation
 

Boerewors is most traditionally braaied (grilled over charcoal or wood), but is often cooked under an electric grill, or roasted in an oven, or fried in a pan. When cooking Boerewors, pricking the casing should be avoided at all cost, as doing this will lead to the "wors" drying out during preparation.  A local variant of the hot dog is the boerewors roll, or "boerie", which is a piece of boerewors in a hot dog bun, often served with a tomato, chili and onion relish or chakalaka. Some people prefer Boerewors stew which can be prepared with mash potatoes or pap.

Variations
The many varieties of boerewors include specialties such as garlic wors, kameeldoring (camel thorn), Karoowors (sausage from the Karoo region in South Africa), and spekwors (made with extra cubed pork fat). Other ingredients include cheese and chilli peppers.

A similar sausage may also be made from the meat of different animal species, such as kudu, and springbok, but it may not be sold as boerewors. Instead, it is named after the predominant meat species, but only if it contains at least 75% meat from that specific species.  When a sausage is made from different types of game, it may not be labelled boerewors but must be labelled as sausage and with the names of all the game species in it.

Boerewors does not keep well unrefrigerated. A similar dried or cured sausage called droëwors is prepared instead in a process similar to the preparation of biltong. Droëwors has become popular in its own right as a snack.

In response to the modern plant-based food movement, various vegan boerewors variants, mostly made by small and home-based industries, have begun to appear in retailers and food markets in South Africa.

Competitions

The preparation and grilling of boerewors has become a fine art with many local, regional and national competitions taking place. The Shoprite supermarket chain hosts an annual competition to determine the best new preparations. The winner of this competition has the privilege of having their product/recipe manufactured and sold in all Checkers stores nationwide, under the Championship Boerewors brand.

See also
 South African cuisine

References

South African cuisine
Fresh sausages
Afrikaans words and phrases
South African English